The New Catalogue of Suspected Variable Stars (NSV) is a star catalogue containing 14,811 stars which, although suspected to be variable, were not given variable star designations prior to 1980. It was published in 1982.

References

External links
 New Catalogue of Suspected Variable Stars: The Improved Version, on line at the Sternberg Astronomical Institute, Moscow University.

Astronomical catalogues of stars
Variable stars